is a 1958 black-and-white Japanese film directed by Ishirō Honda.

Cast

Release
Song for a Bride was released on February 11, 1958.

Reception
In a retrospective review, Steve Ryfle and Ed Godziszewski declared the film "one of Honda's most thoroughly entertaining film" that "showcases Honda's flair for comedy in ways similar to Mothra and King Kong vs. Godzilla" had."

References 

Bibliography

External links 
  http://www.ishirohonda.com/works/195802-sanju/195802-sanju.shtml
 

Japanese black-and-white films
1958 films
Films directed by Ishirō Honda
Films produced by Sanezumi Fujimoto
Films scored by Masaru Sato
1950s Japanese films